Ernest "Nestl" Aljančič (5 December 1916 – 19 November 2006) was a Slovenian ice hockey player and official.

Aljančič was one of ice-hockey pioneers in Yugoslavia. As a member of SK Ilrija he participated in the first Yugoslavian ice-hockey game against Kamnik team. He continued to play after the Second World War in the renamed HK Ljubljana team. He also played for the Yugoslavia national ice hockey team in the first international match against Austria national ice hockey team, where Aljančič scored first Yugoslav international goal. As a part of the Yugoslavia national team he participated in the 1951 and 1955 World Ice Hockey Championships, scoring two goals.

In 1957, after a 25-year ice-hockey career, Aljančič retired. He later worked as an official trying to popularise the sport in Slovenia, helped to build Hala Tivoli ice-hockey rink and organize the 1966 World Ice Hockey Championships in it. As the first Slovenian he was introduced to the IIHF Hall of Fame in 2002. In 2007 he was introduced to the Slovenian Hockey Hall of Fame.

His two sons, Ernest Aljančič and Jani Aljančič, have also played ice-hockey for Olimpija and Yugoslavia national ice hockey team. Ernest was also the president of the Ice Hockey Federation of Slovenia for 15 years.

References

1916 births
2006 deaths
HDD Olimpija Ljubljana players
IIHF Hall of Fame inductees
Slovenian ice hockey coaches
Slovenian ice hockey players
Slovenian sports executives and administrators
Sportspeople from Ljubljana
Yugoslav ice hockey players